Fan Changlong (born May 1947) is a retired general in the People's Liberation Army (PLA) of the People's Republic of China. He was a Vice Chairman of the Central Military Commission, and formerly served as commander of the Jinan Military Region.

Biography 
Fan was born in Dandong, Liaoning. He joined the PLA and the Chinese Communist Party in 1969. He became a major general in 1995, a lieutenant general in 2002, and general on July 15, 2008.  Fan has been an alternate member of the 16th Central Committee of the Chinese Communist Party, and a full member of the 17th Central Committee. In 2012, ahead of the 18th Party Congress, he was appointed Vice Chairman of the Central Military Commission.

In mid-April 2016, he paid a visit to the disputed Spratly Islands in the South China Sea, according to the country’s Ministry of National Defense, which reported the visit on Friday 15 April 2016. Gen. Fan Changlong was said to have been the highest-ranking People’s Liberation Army officer ever to visit the Spratly Islands. General Fan led a delegation to the “relevant Nansha Islands to offer good wishes to officers and personnel stationed there, and also to understand the construction of facilities on the islands,” said a brief statement from the Ministry of National Defense. His tour appeared intended to show China’s determination to ward off any challenges to its claims over the islands, which are also the subject of claims by the Philippines, Malaysia, Vietnam, Brunei and Taiwan.

Fan Changlong retired from Politburo after the 19th Party Congress in October 2017 and from Central Military Committee in March 2018.

References 

1947 births
Living people
People's Liberation Army generals from Liaoning
People from Dandong
Chiefs of Staff of the Shenyang Military Region
Commanders of the Jinan Military Region
Members of the 18th Politburo of the Chinese Communist Party
Alternate members of the 16th Central Committee of the Chinese Communist Party
Members of the 17th Central Committee of the Chinese Communist Party
Members of the 18th Central Committee of the Chinese Communist Party